The Prince Albert (PA) is one of the most common male genital piercings. The PA is "a ring-style piercing that extends along the underside of the glans from the urethral opening to where the glans meets the shaft of the penis." The related "reverse Prince Albert piercing" enters through the urethra and exits through a hole pierced in the top of the glans.

While some piercers may choose to avoid the nerve bundle that runs along the center of the frenulum altogether, others may choose otherwise. The piercing can be centred if the bearer is circumcised. Otherwise, the piercing must be done off-centre so that the surrounding skin can reposition itself.

Procedure
The piercer usually starts by pushing a metal or glass tube down the urethra, or using their fingers to hold the urethra open. The piercer then slides the needle into the frenulum and goes up the tube, using pliers to bend the ring into shape.

Healing and potential side effects
The Prince Albert healing time can take from 4 weeks to 6 months. A fresh PA piercing may cause bleeding, swelling and inflammation. In rare cases, it can lead to local infections. Some men find that the dribble caused by the PA when urinating necessitates sitting down to urinate. With practice, some men can control the stream while standing.

Some PA wearers report it enhances sexual pleasure for both partners. However, others penetrated by males with this piercing report discomfort. PA rings can cause additional discomfort to female partners in cases when the penis comes in contact with the cervix. Sexual partners of those with piercings may experience complications during oral sex such as chipped teeth, choking, foreign bodies getting stuck between the partner's teeth, and mucosal injury to receptive partners.

As with many piercings, there is risk of the jewelry becoming caught on clothing and being pulled or torn out. Very large gauge or heavy jewelry can cause thinning of the tissue between the urethral opening and the healed fistula resulting in an accidental tearing or other complications with sexual experiences. Conversely, extremely thin jewelry can cause the same tearing in what is commonly referred to as the "cheese cutter effect", either during sudden torsion or over a long period of wearing, especially if the thin jewelry bears any weight.

Jewelry 

Prince Albert piercings are typically pierced at either 12 or 10g (2 or 2.5mm). They are often (gradually) stretched soon after, with jewelry within the 8g to 2g (3mm to 6.5mm) range being the most popular. One of the reasons not to perform the initial piercing at a small diameter (16g or 14g) or otherwise to immediately stretch it to 10g or 8g using a taper is to prevent the 'cheese-cutter effect', although personal preference and individual anatomy also play a role in these decisions.

Further stretching to sizes 0 or 00g (8 or 9mm) and larger is not uncommon. If a sufficiently heavy barbell or ring is worn continuously, a mild form of 'auto-stretching' can be observed. This means that stretching to a larger gauge is easier and might not require a taper.

While most wearers find that PAs are comfortable to wear and rarely remove them, even during sex, some individuals have found that extremely large or heavy jewelry is uncomfortable to wear for long periods or interferes with the sexual functioning of the penis.

Jewelry suitably worn in a Prince Albert piercing includes the circular barbell, curved barbell, captive bead, segment ring, and the prince's wand. Curved barbells used for PA piercings are worn such that one ball sits on the lower side of the penis and the other ball sits at the urethral opening. This type of jewelry prevents discomfort that can come from larger jewelry moving around during daily wear.

History and culture 
The origin of this piercing is unknown. Many theories suggest that the piercing was used to secure the penis in some manner, rather than having a sexual or cultural purpose. Genital piercings appeared in the Kama Sutra as a way of enhancing sexual pleasure.

In modern times, the Prince Albert piercing was popularized by Jim Ward in the early 1970s. In West Hollywood, Ward met Richard Simonton (aka Doug Malloy) and Fakir Musafar. Malloy published a pamphlet in which he concocted fanciful histories of genital piercings in particular. These apocryphal tales—which included the notion that Albert, the Prince Consort invented the piercing that shares his name in order to tame the appearance of his large penis in tight trousers—are widely circulated as urban legend. No historical proof of their veracity has been located independent of Malloy's assertions.

Like many other male genital piercings, it had a history of practice in gay male subculture in the twentieth century. It became more prominently known when body piercing expanded in the late 1970s and was gradually embraced by popular culture.

See also 
 Genital piercing
 Princess Albertina piercing

References

Sources

External links 

 Modification E-zine entry on Prince Albert piercings
 Body Piercing in Brief, text of Malloy/Ward pamphlet
 UK Fetish Info: Getting a PA piercing
 UK Fetish Info: Living with a PA piercing
 Association of Professional Piercers' body piercing aftercare guidelines

Penis piercings

fr:Piercing génital masculin